In enzymology, a 2-oxoadipate reductase is an enzyme that catalyzes the chemical reaction

2-hydroxyadipate + NAD+  2-oxoadipate + NADH + H+

Thus, the two substrates of this enzyme are 2-hydroxyadipate and NAD+, whereas its 3 products are 2-oxoadipate, NADH, and H+.

This enzyme belongs to the family of oxidoreductases, specifically those acting on the CH-OH group of donor with NAD+ or NADP+ as acceptor. The systematic name of this enzyme class is 2-hydroxyadipate:NAD+ 2-oxidoreductase. Other names in common use include 2-ketoadipate reductase, alpha-ketoadipate reductase, and 2-ketoadipate reductase.

References

 

EC 1.1.1
NADH-dependent enzymes
Enzymes of unknown structure